Sentani is a district and also the capital of Jayapura Regency, Papua (province), Indonesia. Sentani District has an area of around 98.00 km2 with a total population in 2021 of around 75,742 people, and a population density of around 772,88 jiwa/km2. Meanwhile, the capital of the district is located in Sentani Kota.

Geography 
The boundaries of the Sentani District are as follows:

In 2020, Sentani District has 10 villages, 60 RW and 217 RT, with Sentani Kota having the highest RT dan RW at 12 RW and 53 RT.

Demography

Religion
According to the Ministry of Home Affairs data, the majority of religion adherents at 58.16% are Protestants, 6.05% are Catholics, 35.44% are Muslims, 0.18% are Buddhists, and 0.17% are Hindus. There are 66 Protestant churches, 22 Mosques, 3 catholic churches and 1 Pura.

References 

Populated places in Papua (province)
Regency seats of Papua (province)